The Avro 691 Lancastrian was a Canadian and British passenger and mail transport aircraft of the 1940s and 1950s developed from the Avro Lancaster heavy bomber. The Lancaster was named after Lancaster, Lancashire.

The Lancastrian was basically a modified Lancaster bomber without armour or armament and with the gun turrets replaced by streamlined metal fairings, including a new nose section. The initial batch was converted directly from Lancasters; later batches were new builds.

Design and development
In 1943, Canada's Victory Aircraft converted a Lancaster X bomber for civilian transport duties with Trans-Canada Airlines (TCA). (After the war Victory Aircraft was purchased by what became Avro Canada). This conversion was a success, resulting in eight additional Lancaster Xs being converted. The "specials" were powered by Packard-built Merlin 38 engines and featured a lengthened, streamlined nose and tail cone. Range was increased by two 400 gal (1,818 L) Lancaster long-range fuel tanks fitted as standard in the bomb bay. These Lancastrians were used by TCA on its Montreal–Prestwick route.

The modification of abundant military aircraft into desperately needed civilian transports was common in the United Kingdom in the immediate postwar period; the Handley Page Halton was a similar conversion of the Halifax heavy bomber.

Operational history

In 1945, deliveries commenced of 30 British-built Lancastrians for BOAC. On a demonstration flight on 23 April 1945, G-AGLF flew 13,500 mi (21,700 km) from England to Auckland, New Zealand in three days, 14 hours at an average speed of 220 mph (354 km/h).

The Lancastrian was fast, had a long range, and was capable of carrying a heavy load, but space inside was very limited as the Lancaster had been designed with space for its seven crew dispersed throughout the fuselage, and with the majority of the load being carried in the 33 ft (10.05 m) long bomb bay. Consequently, as passengers are bulky but low in weight, it was not suited to carry large numbers of passengers, but was suitable for mail and a small number of VIP passengers. BOAC used it for flights between England and Australia from 31 May 1945. It also served with the RAF; RAF Lancaster I serial number PD328, was converted to a Lancastrian and renamed Aries, as well as serving with Qantas and Flota Aérea Mercante Argentina.

Lancastrians were used during the Berlin Airlift to transport petrol; 15 aircraft made over 5,000 trips. In 1946 a Lancastrian operated by BSAA was the first aircraft to make a scheduled flight from the then-newly opened London Heathrow Airport.

Lancastrian engine testbeds
Data from: Avro Aircraft since 1908

With the advent of gas turbine engines there emerged a need to test the new engines in a controlled flight environment in well instrumented installations. An ideal candidate emerged as the Avro Lancastrian which could easily accommodate the test instrumentation as well as fly on the power of two piston engines if required. Several Lancastrians were allocated for engine test-bed work with turbojet engines replacing the outer Merlin engines or test piston engines in the inner nacelles. Fuel arrangements varied but could include kerosene jet fuel in outer wing tanks or fuselage tanks, with avgas carried in remaining fuel tanks.

Accidents and incidents 
The Aviation Safety Network, part of the Flight Safety Foundation, records 23 hull loss accidents involving the Lancastrian occurring between 1946 and 1964 resulting in a total of 91 fatalities.

Notable accidents include

Lancastrian T-102

Lancastrian T-102 of the Argentine Air Force crashed on 11 December 1960 near San Andrés de Giles, Argentina. All 31 on board were killed. This was the worst accident involving this type of aircraft.

 Lancastrian G-AGWH , Star Dust

On 2 August 1947 Lancastrian G-AGWH Star Dust of British South American Airways was lost in the Andes, whilst en route from Buenos Aires, Argentina, to Santiago, Chile. The probable cause of the crash was a navigation error due to the then-unknown effect of the fast-moving jetstream.

 Lancastrian G-AGLX 

Lancastrian G-AGLX was lost over the Indian Ocean en route between British Ceylon and Cocos (Keeling) Islands, all 10 on board died.

Variants
Lancaster XPP
Nine built by converting Lancaster Mk. Xs at Victory Aircraft Ltd Canada.
Lancastrian C.1
Nine-seat transport aircraft for BOAC and Qantas. Royal Air Force designation Lancastrian C.1 to Specification 16/44. A total of 23 built by Avro
Lancastrian C.2
Nine-seat military transport aircraft for the RAF. A total of 33 built by Avro
Lancastrian 3
13-seat transport aircraft for British South American Airways. A total of 18 built by Avro
Lancastrian C.4
Ten to 13-seat military transport aircraft for the RAF. Eight built by Avro

Operators

Civil operators

Flota Aérea Mercante Argentina (FAMA) - three C.4 incorporated in 1947

Qantas

Trans Canada Airlines

Alitalia – five Lancastrians operated from 1947 until 1952

British European Airways
British Overseas Airways Corporation (BOAC)
British South American Airways
Flight Refuelling Ltd
Silver City
Skyways Limited

Military operators

Argentine Air Force - two C.4 ex-FAMA, incorporated in 1948

Royal Air Force
No. 24 Squadron RAF
No. 231 Squadron RAF
No. 232 Squadron RAF

Specifications (Lancastrian C.1)

{{Aircraft specs
|ref=Jane's All the World's Aircraft 1947, Avro Aircraft since 1908
|prime units?=imp

|crew=4 + 1 cabin crew
|capacity=9
|length ft=76
|length in=10
|length note=
|span ft=102
|span in=
|span note=
|height ft=17
|height in=10
|height note=
|wing area sqft=1297
|wing area note=
|aspect ratio=8.02
|airfoil=root: NACA 23018; tip: NACA 23012
|empty weight lb=37190
|empty weight note=equipped
|gross weight lb=65000
|gross weight note=
Maximum landing weight: 
|max takeoff weight lb=
|max takeoff weight note=
|more general=

|eng1 number=4
|eng1 name=Rolls-Royce Merlin 24/2
|eng1 type=V-12 liquid-cooled piston engines
|eng1 hp=1620
|eng1 note=

|prop blade number=3
|prop name=de Havilland Hydromatic
|prop dia ft=13
|prop dia note=constant-speed fully-feathering propellers

|max speed mph=315
 at sea level
 at 
|cruise speed mph=290
|cruise speed note=maximum weak mixture at 
 at 
 at sea level
|stall speed mph=
|stall speed note=
|never exceed speed mph=
|never exceed speed note=
|minimum control speed mph=
|minimum control speed note=
|range miles=4100
|ferry range miles=
|ferry range note=
|endurance=
|ceiling ft=24300
|ceiling note=
 on three engines
Absolute ceiling:  at maximum continuous power
 on three engines
|climb rate ftmin=970
 at sea levelMaximum rate of climb on three engines:  at sea level
 at 
|time to altitude=
|wing loading lb/sqft=50
|wing loading note=
|fuel consumption lb/mi=
|power/mass=
|more performance=Take-off distance to : Landing run:' 

|avionics=
}}

See also

Notes

Bibliography
 Franks, Richard A. The Avro Lancaster, Manchester and Lincoln: A Comprehensive Guide for the Modeller. London: SAM Publications, 2000. .
 Holmes, Harry. Avro Lancaster (Combat Legend series). Shrewsbury, UK: Airlife Publishing Ltd., 2002. .
 Jackson, A.J. Avro Aircraft since 1908, 2nd edition. London: Putnam Aeronautical Books, 1990. .
 Mackay, R.S.G. Lancaster in action. Carrollton, Texas: Squadron/Signal Publications Inc., 1982. .
 
 Milberry, Larry. The Canadair North Star. Toronto: CANAV Books, 1982. .
 Ottaway, Susan and Ian. Fly With the Stars – A History of British South American Airways. Andover, Hampshire, UK: Speedman Press, 2007. .

 Taylor, John W. R. "Avro Lancaster." Combat Aircraft of the World from 1909 to the present. New York: G.P. Putnam's Sons, 1969. .

 Further reading 

External links

 "The Lancastrian," a 1945 Flight article on the Avro Lancastrian
 "The Pathfinder goes by Star Light," a 1946 AVRO advertisement for the Lancastrian in  Flight magazine
 "England to Australia in 3 Days!" – a 1945 advertisement in Flight magazine for the BOAC Lancastrian service to Australia
 "Flight in the Nene Lancastrian" a 1946 Flight'' article
 "Nene Installation," a 1947 Flight article on the Rolls-Royce Nene jet engine experimental installation on the Lancastrian

Aviation in Lancashire
Lancastrian
1940s British airliners
1940s British mailplanes
Lancastrian
Mid-wing aircraft
Four-engined tractor aircraft
Aircraft first flown in 1943
Four-engined piston aircraft
Twin-tail aircraft